Christopher Stephen Begg (born September 12, 1979 in Uxbridge, Ontario) is a Canadian former professional baseball pitcher.

Career
A graduate of Niagara University, Begg was signed as an undrafted free agent by the San Francisco Giants in 2003 after pitching for the St. Paul Saints of the Northern League. Begg was also named the 2001 MAAC Pitcher of the Year.

He was promoted to the AAA affiliate of the Giants, the Fresno Grizzlies. In his first start he pitched six innings, giving up one run, en route to the win.  Begg last pitched for the Giants organization in 2008.

International career
Begg was selected for Canada national baseball team in the 2004 Summer Olympics, 2006 World Baseball Classic, 2008 Summer Olympics
2009 World Baseball Classic and 2009 Baseball World Cup.

Notes

References 

1979 births
Living people
Albany-Colonie Diamond Dogs players
Baseball pitchers
Baseball people from Ontario
Baseball players at the 2004 Summer Olympics
Baseball players at the 2008 Summer Olympics
Canadian expatriate baseball players in the United States
Connecticut Defenders players
Fresno Grizzlies players
Johnstown Johnnies players
Niagara Purple Eagles baseball players
Norwich Navigators players
Olympic baseball players of Canada
People from Uxbridge, Ontario
Québec Capitales players
Salem-Keizer Volcanoes players
San Jose Giants players
St. Paul Saints players
World Baseball Classic players of Canada
2006 World Baseball Classic players
2009 World Baseball Classic players
Grand Canyon Rafters players
Águilas del Zulia players
Tiburones de La Guaira players
Canadian expatriate baseball players in Venezuela